Open Hearing may refer to:

Open Hearing (American TV program), news-related discussion show seen in 1954 and 1957–58
Open Hearing (Australian TV program), topical subjects panel discussion show seen in 1960–61